Under30Media is a U.S. business and entrepreneurship website. It was launched in 2008 and based in New York City. The brand comprises Under30CEO, Under30Finance, Under30Careers, and Under30Experiences.

Description 
Under30Media is a U.S. business and entrepreneurship website launched in 2008 and based in New York City. Founded by Jared O’Toole and Matt Wilson, it is the overarching brand in which Under30CEO, Under30Finance, Under30Careers, and Under30Experiences fall under. The founders, Wilson and O’Toole, draw on their own experiences to provide educational resources and mentor other young entrepreneurs.

Based on a subscription, advertising and consulting services revenue model, the site attracts roughly 150,000 page views and 75,000 unique visitors per month. Its original works are sometimes cited by other, larger, publications such as Business Insider and Forbes.

Brands

Under30CEO 
Under30CEO is a news and trend media site offering young entrepreneurs the tools and resources to succeed. Featured experts include James Marshall Reilly, Matt Mickiewicz, and Young Entrepreneur Council. On April 15, 2016, Under30CEO was acquired by Rich20Something Media, Inc.

Under30Experiences 
Under30Experiences was highlighted in Forbes and The New York Times. Forbes listed the professional retreat as one of the "Top 4 Retreats to Explore in 2013." Group trips for entrepreneurs have been organized in Iceland, Costa Rica, and Nicaragua.

References

External links
Under30Media homepage

Economics websites
American news websites
Internet properties established in 2008
Companies based in New York City